Legio II Herculia (devoted to Hercules) was a Roman legion, levied by Emperor Diocletian (284–305), possibly together with I Iovia, to guard the newly created province of Scythia Minor. It was stationed at Capidava. The cognomen of this legion came from Herculius, the attribute of Maximian (Diocletian's colleague) meaning "similar to Hercules".

According to Notitia Dignitatum, at the beginning of the 5th-century, II Herculia was still in its camp on the Danube.

See also
 List of Roman legions

References and external links 
 livius.org account

02 Herculia
Military units and formations established in the 3rd century